Barnard is an unincorporated community in Jackson Township, Putnam County, in the U.S. state of Indiana.

History
Barnard was originally called Fort Red, and under the latter name was laid out in 1876. The present name is for Calvin Barnard, the original owner of the town site. A post office was established at Fort Red in 1876, the name was changed to Barnard in 1880, and the post office closed in 1912.

Geography

References

Unincorporated communities in Putnam County, Indiana
Unincorporated communities in Indiana